Manuel Gil is a Spanish film and television actor.

Selected filmography
College Boarding House (1959)
Anchor Button (1961)
Ursus (1961)
 The Robbers (1962)
 Code Name: Jaguar (1965)
 Great Friends (1967)
 Sor Ye Ye (1967)
 Corazón salvaje (1968)
 Simón Bolívar (1969)
 Growing Leg, Diminishing Skirt (1970)
 The Legion Like Women (1976)

References

Bibliography
 Peter Cowie & Derek Elley. World Filmography: 1967. Fairleigh Dickinson University Press, 1977.

External links

1933 births
Living people
Spanish male television actors
Spanish male film actors